Bernard Oughtred (1880–1949) was a rugby union international who represented England from 1901 to 1903. He also captained his country.

Early life
Bernard Oughtred was born on 22 August 1880 in Hartlepool.

Rugby union career
Oughtred made his international debut on 9 March 1901 at Rectory Field, Blackheath in the England vs Scotland match.
Of the 6 matches he played for his national side he was on the winning side on 2 occasions.
He played his final match for England on 14 February 1903 at Lansdowne Road in the Ireland vs England match.

References

1880 births
1949 deaths
Durham County RFU players
England international rugby union players
English rugby union players
Rugby union fly-halves
Rugby union players from Hartlepool